Altona is an unincorporated community in Wayne County, Nebraska, United States.

History
Altona was founded in 1898. It was named after Altona, in Germany. A post office was established at Altona in 1898, and remained in operation until it was discontinued in 1935.

First Trinity Lutheran Church
Altona is also the home of First Trinity Lutheran Church, a congregation of the Lutheran Church-Missouri Synod. First Trinity was founded in 1881, and the congregation celebrated their 140th anniversary in 2021.

References

Populated places in Wayne County, Nebraska
Unincorporated communities in Nebraska